Alexander Gurney (born September 4, 1974) is an American racing driver who competes in the Rolex Sports Car Series for GAINSCO/Bob Stallings Racing. He won the 2007 and 2009 GRAND-AM Rolex Sports Car Series Daytona Prototype drivers' championship and is the son of racing legend Dan Gurney.  In 2013, he came in third place with teammate Jon Fogarty. The following year he became the first Corvette Daytona Prototype driver with an overall pole position for the Rolex 24 At Daytona, after which he retired.

Early racing career
The youngest son of 1968 Indianapolis 500 runner-up and Formula One driver Dan Gurney, Alex competed in the Midwest Skip Barber Formula Dodge Series, Barber Dodge Pro Series, Toyota Atlantic Championship, and British Formula 3 Championship.

Rolex Sports Car Series
Gurney moved to the Rolex Sports Car Series in 2005, driving for GAINSCO/Bob Stallings Racing in the Daytona Prototype division. He scored two poles and four top-10 finishes in his first year, co-driving with team owner Bob Stallings.

In 2006, Gurney was paired with fellow former Atlantic Championship star Jon Fogarty, finishing 11th in Daytona Prototype points with two runner-up finishes to his credit. In 2007, the pairing combined for a series-record seven wins and ten poles, en route to the Daytona Prototype drivers' championship.

Gurney and Fogarty finished second in the championship standings in 2008, with one victory and eight top-five finishes. In 2009, they earned their second Daytona Prototype championship in a season that saw the No. 99 GAINSCO Riley Pontiac score four victories and six pole positions.

In 2010 and 2011, Gurney finished fourth in the Daytona Prototype points standings.

Fogarty and Gurney return to GAINSCO/Bob Stallings Racing for 2012, with its Riley-Chevrolet sporting new Corvette-themed bodywork introduced by GM.

iRacing 
Gurney finished first in the 2021 Season 1 Radical Racing Challenge Division 3 Championship and holds 12 Time Attack Overall podiums.

Personal life
Gurney is married to Colleen and has two children. He holds a Business Administration degree from the University of Colorado.

Gurney portrayed his father in the 2019 film Ford v Ferrari.

Motorsports racing results

American open-wheel racing results
(key)

Barber Dodge Pro Series

Atlantic Championship

Rolex Series career
(key) (Races in bold indicate pole position)

WeatherTech SportsCar Championship results
(key)(Races in bold indicate pole position, Results are overall/class)

References 

 Alex Gurney profile at the official Bob Stallings Racing website
 Alex Gurney profile at the Grand-Am official website
 Alex Gurney statistics at Driver Database
 Alex Gurney statistics at Racing Reference

1974 births
24 Hours of Daytona drivers
Atlantic Championship drivers
British Formula Three Championship drivers
Rolex Sports Car Series drivers
Living people
Sportspeople from Newport Beach, California
Racing drivers from California
University of Colorado alumni
WeatherTech SportsCar Championship drivers
Barber Pro Series drivers
American racing drivers
Fortec Motorsport drivers
Andretti Autosport drivers